Guzel or Güzel may refer to:

 Güzel, Çermik
 Güzel, Güdül, village in Ankara Province, Turkey
 Güzel (album) by Turkish pop music singer Yıldız Tilbe

Given name 
 Guzel Maitdinova (born 1952), Eurasian geopolitician, ethnologist, historian and archeologist
 Guzel Khubbieva (born 1976), Uzbekistani sprinter
 Guzel Yakhina (born 1977), Russian author and screenwriter
 Guzel Manyurova (born 1978), Russian and Kazakhstani freestyle wrestler

Surnames
 Ecem Güzel (born 1995), Turkish sport sailor
 Galip Güzel (born 1987), Turkish association football player
 Hasan Celal Güzel (1945–2018), Turkish journalist and politician